Chrysolina  varians is a species of leaf beetle native to Europe.

References

External links
Images representing Chysolina at BOLD

Chrysomelinae
Beetles described in 1783
Beetles of Europe